The Chișinău Marathon is an annual marathon and sport event hosted by the city of Chișinău, Moldova since 2015. It is usually held in the autumn.

History

2015

The first Chisinau International Marathon was held on April 26, 2015; it became the first Chisinau Marathon race since 1986. It was organized by the public sports organization Sporter.md with the support of the Ministry of Youth and Sports of Moldova and the sponsorship of the oil and gas company - Petrom. The organizer and the sponsor provided in equal parts the competition budget: 1 billion MDL. The marathon preparation took about a year, and 300 volunteers participated in this process.
Marathon competitions included 4 distanced: marathon (participation fee 200 MDL), half-marathon, 10 km (participation fee 100 MDL each) and 3 km (so-called Fun Run, free of charge). One day before the competition, a sports fair was organized in the center of Chișinău, as well as a 400 meters running competition for children, who were divided into three age categories: 5-6 years, 7-9 years and 10-12 years.
In 2015, about 10,000 people participated, of whom almost 1,400 took the main three distances and 140 - the marathon. Citizens of Moldova and other countries - Austria, Belarus, Germany, India, USA, Russia, Ukraine and Sweden - could be seen among the runners. Journalists noticed among the participants the Mayor of Chișinău - Dorin Chirtoacă, the Head of Economic Department of EU Delegation to the Republic of Moldova - Wicher Slagter and the British Ambassador - Philip Batson.

2016

The second Chișinău International Marathon was held on April 17, 2016. It was organized by the public sports organization Sporter.md with the support of the Ministry of Youth and Sports of Moldova and the sponsorship of the oil and gas company - Petrom.
Over 15,000 people gathered in the central square in Chisinau to run the marathon (42 km 195 m), half-marathon (21 km 0975 m), 10 km and the Fun Run (3 km).
In the framework of the event, a sports fair was organized, which was attended by over 30 companies. The day before the official start of the Chisinau Marathon, a 200-meter children’s race was organized for three age categories: 5-6 years, 7-9 years and 10-12 years.
About 400 volunteers helped the organizers in the preparation process and on the very day of the marathon. Guests from over 50 countries, politicians, professional athletes of various sports, as well as various commercial companies and charity organizations participated in the Chisinau Marathon.

2017

The third Chișinău International Marathon was held on October 1, 2017. On this day, the Moldovan capital became the center of attraction for all running enthusiasts and active lifestyle practitioners. The Chisinau Marathon became a new experience in the running career for both local and foreign athletes, who came from over 50 countries. The marathon was organized by the public sports organization Sporter.md with the sponsorship of Kaufland supermarket chain.
This year, 17,000 people participated in the Chisinau Marathon. Participants were offered 5 distances to choose from: marathon (42 km 195 m), half-marathon (21 km 0975 m), 5 km, 10 km and the Fun Run (1.5 km).
A day before, on September 30, as a part of Chisinau Marathon, was organized a 200-meter children’s race for three age categories: 5-6 years, 7-9 years and 10-12 years. 400 children participated.
For three days, a sports fair was opened in the center of Chisinau. Various sport brands, charity organizations and commercial companies took part in the fair. In the center of the fair, a Food Zone was arranged, where they had a free Pasta Party and victory celebration.

2018

The fourth Chisinau International Marathon was held on September 30, 2018. According to established tradition, both professional sportsmen and beginners who had their first marathon challenge could participate in the event. The event was attended by the representatives of more than 50 countries. By organizers account, more than 2,000 foreign athletes took part in the Chisinau Marathon. 
This year, 18,000 people attended the Marathon. Participants were offered 5 distances to choose from: marathon (42 km 195 m), half-marathon (21 km 0975 m), 5 km, 10 km and the Fun Run (1.5 km). For the first time in the Chisinau Marathon history, a category for wheelchair athletes was open - “Marathon for All”.
Kenyan runner, Benjamin Kiprop Serem, set the track record: he ran 42 km in 2 hours 16 minutes 38 seconds. Also, half-marathon records were set.
A day earlier, on September 29, as a part of Chisinau Marathon, children’s races were organized: 400 m, 800 m, 1 200 m, 2 000 m. 500 children participated in the event. Also on this day, famous travelers - Olga Rumyantseva and Vladimir Kotlyar, as well as marathon athletes - Yaroslav Mushinsky and Leonid Shvetsov, gave public lectures.

2019 
In 2019, the Chisinau Marathon celebrated its fifth anniversary. This edition took place on September 29 under the slogan: “High five!”.

Traditionally, the races on the 5 distances of the Marathon – marathon (42 km 195 m), half marathon (21 km 0975 m), 10 and 5 km races, Fun Run (1.5 km) – took place on the central streets of the capital. The “Marathon for All” distance was also reopened for wheelchair athletes.

As in previous years, both experienced athletes and participants who have just started their passion for running were allowed to participate in the races. According to the organizers, in 2019, about 20,000 participants gathered in the Great National Assembly Square in Chisinau, including participants from other countries, such as Ukraine, Russia, Romania, Germany, etc.

The winners were the male and female participants who were the first to reach the finish line on the chosen course. In 2019, some competitors managed to outdo the previous records. Thus, in the half-marathon distance, Maxim Răilianu finished in 1:06:11.9 (previous record – 1:06:12.0), and Katerina Karmanenko set a record in the women's race – 1:20:16.3 (previous record – 1:20:43.0).

On September 28, the Kids Run Day children's races was held as part of the Chisinau Marathon. Children between 5 and 13 years old participated in the 400 m, 800 m, 1200 m and 2000 m races.

2020 

Anyone could support the event and participate in the race online. To do so, the organizers suggested participants to wear a T-shirt from previous editions of the Chisinau Marathon, choose any of the distances: 1.5 km, 5 km, 10 km, 21 km or 42 km and take the start on 27 September at 9:00, anywhere in the city, in the country or in the world.

On this day, not only runners from Chisinau, but also from Ungheni, Balti, Soroca, various cities in Transnistria, as well as from the USA, Italy, Romania, Greece and even India ran in support of the Chisinau Online 2020 International Marathon.

2021 
In 2021, the sixth edition of the Chisinau International Marathon took place. It was the first major sporting event organized by Sporter after a year and a half of the COVID-19 pandemic.

The marathon was held on October 17, but under strict conditions. Only athletes who were able to present health certificates were accepted to participate. Free express coronavirus tests were performed for participants and supporters. For safety reasons, the number of slots in 2021 has been reduced to 2,000, and the Fun Run distance (1.5 km), which traditionally was attended by all those who wish to participate, has been canceled.

As in previous years, competitors had four basic distances they could choose from: marathon (42 km 195 m), half marathon (21 km 0975 m), 10 km and 5 km. For the first time, the 5-km route has been modified. In 2021, the already traditional distance for wheelchair athletes “Marathon for All” was also available, and there were 35 participants.

On October 16, the Kids Run Day children's race was held as part of the Chisinau Marathon.

2022 
In 2022, the eighth edition of the Chisinau International Marathon took place. Paying tribute to kind-hearted and hospitable Moldovans, the organizers carried out large-scale rebranding, and now the race is called Chisinau Big Hearts Marathon.

The race was held on September 25. Altogether about 10,000 athletes from different countries participated.

The organizers have prepared 5 main distances for athletes: marathon (42 km 195 m), half marathon (21 km 0975 m), 10K, 5K and Fun Run (1.5K). Fun Run is a free race held for the first time after two years of Covid-19 pandemic restrictions. For the fourth year in a row, the Marathon for All was arranged for wheelchair athletes. On September 23, there was a Kids Run Day race for children in four age categories: 5-6 years old, 7-8 years old, 9-10 years old, and 11-13 years old.

On the occasion of the race, festive events such as fairs and contests have been held for three days in the center of the Moldavian capital. On the evening of September 23, before the big start, a traditional free Pasta Party was given for participants.

The organizers of the party were Sporter public organization and 999.md online classifieds, with the support of Chisinau City Hall. The event was supported by a team of 200 volunteers and about 30 partners.

Course 

The marathon and half-marathon course: Great National Assembly Square (opposite the Triumphal Arch) - Stefan cel Mare Av. - Ciuflea St. - Dacia Av. (to Trandafirilor St.) - Dacia Av. - Ciuflea St. - Stefan cel Mare Av. (to Toma Ciorba St.) - Stefan cel Mare Av. -  Great National Assembly Square (4 laps of 10.5 km for marathoners and 2 laps of 10.5 km for half-marathoners with time limit of 6 hours and 3 hours, respectively).
10 km course: Stefan cel Mare Av. - Ciuflea St. - Dacia Av. (to Trandafirilor St.) - Dacia Av. - Ciuflea St. - Stefan cel Mare Av. (to Toma Ciorba St.) - Stefan cel Mare Av. - Great National Assembly Square (with 1.5 hours time limit).
5 km course: Great National Assembly Square - turn at the intersection of Stefan cel Mare Av. and Ismail St. - Stefan cel Mare Av. - turn at the intersection of Stefan cel Mare Av. and Toma Ciorba St. - Stefan cel Mare Av. - Great National Assembly Square.
Fun Run route: Great National Assembly Square - Vasile Alecsandri St. - Veronica Micle St. - Banulescu Bodoni  St. - Finish in front of the Stefan cel Mare monument.

Qualification 

Runners over the age of 18 years are allowed to participate in the marathon and half-marathon, runners from 16 years old can participate in the 10 km race, but all need to be registered. The 1.5 km race is open for everybody and does not require registration.

Other races 

In addition to the marathon, the event includes a half marathon, a 10km race, and a 3km fun run.

Winners

Notes

References

External links
Official website

Sport in Chișinău
Marathons in Europe
Recurring sporting events established in 2015
2015 establishments in Moldova
Athletics in Moldova
Spring (season) events in Moldova